is a railway station in Itoshima, Fukuoka Prefecture, Japan. It is operated by JR Kyushu and is on the Chikuhi Line.

Lines
Only local services on the Chikuhi Line stop at this station.

Station layout 
The station consists of a side platform serving a single track. The station building, a small timber structure, is unstaffed and serves only as a waiting room. Automatic ticket vending machines and a Sugoca farecard reader are provided.

Adjacent stations

History
By 1 April 1924, the line had been extended east to Maebaru (today ). Ikisan was opened on 29 April 1924 as an additional station on the existing track between Fukuyoshi and Maebaru. When the Kitakyushu Railway was nationalized on 1 October 1937, Japanese Government Railways (JGR) took over control of the station and designated the line which served it as the Chikuhi Line. With the privatization of Japanese National Railways (JNR), the successor of JGR, on 1 April 1987, control of the station passed to JR Kyushu.

Passenger statistics
In fiscal 2016, the station was used by an average of 450 passengers daily (boarding passengers only), and it ranked 254th among the busiest stations of JR Kyushu.

See also
 List of railway stations in Japan

References

External links
Ikisan Station (JR Kyushu)

Railway stations in Japan opened in 1924
Chikuhi Line
Railway stations in Fukuoka Prefecture
Stations of Kyushu Railway Company